Russian Empire (Russia) competed at the 1908 Summer Olympics in London, England.  It was the second appearance of the European nation, after having missed the 1904 Games.

Late arrival 
Some sources claim that the Russian shooting team was 12 days late to the Olympics due to the Russian Empire still using the Julian calendar as opposed to the rest of Europe, which used the Gregorian system.

Medalists

Results by event

Athletics

Russia had one track & field athlete compete in 1908.  Lind took 19th place of 27 finishers in the marathon.

Figure skating

Wrestling

Notes

Sources
 
 

Nations at the 1908 Summer Olympics
1908
Olympics
Sport in the Russian Empire